The 1993–94 Danish Superliga season was the 4th season of the Danish Superliga league championship, governed by the Danish Football Association.

The tournament was held in two rounds. First round was in the autumn 1993, and the second in the spring 1994. The teams placed first to eighth in first round, played in second round. Their scores were reset to zero, and their mutual points were shorted to the half.

The two teams placed ninth and tenth in first round, played in the qualification league in the spring. They had respectively 8 and 7 points with.

The Danish champions qualified for the UEFA Champions League 1994-95 qualification, while the second and third placed teams qualified for the qualification round of the UEFA Cup 1994-95. The teams placed first and second in the qualification league promoted.

Autumn 1993

Table

Results

Spring 1994

Table

Results

Top goalscorers

See also
 1993-94 in Danish football

External links
  Peders Fodboldstatistik

Danish Superliga seasons
1993–94 in Danish football
Denmark